The music video for recording artist Janet Jackson's single "Rhythm Nation" was directed by Dominic Sena. It was filmed as part of the long-form video Rhythm Nation 1814 film at a power plant located in Pasadena, California. The video is notable for its "post-apocalyptic" warehouse setting, the unisex black military-style uniforms in which Jackson and her dancers were outfitted, and its choreography, considered to "set the template for hundreds of videos to come in the Nineties and aughts". The "Rhythm Nation" video premiered on September 16, 1989, to coincide with the release of Jackson's fourth studio album, Janet Jackson's Rhythm Nation 1814 (1989).

The video's outfit has received various tributes, being displayed at Walt Disney World theme park, Rock & Roll Hall of Fame's "Women Who Rock: Vision, Passion, Power" exhibit, and the National Museum of Women in the Arts. A wax figure of Jackson wearing the outfit was also included in Madame Tussaud's exhibits in Hollywood and New York City, as well as Tussaud's Rock Circus exhibit in London. The song and choreography is also a mainstay at talent shows worldwide, and has been performed at The X Factor, Britain's Got Talent, and America's Best Dance Crew, with an Australian music show also named after the song. Various actors and choreographers, including Wade Robson and Travis Payne, have cited Jackson and the "Rhythm Nation" routine as a primary influence to their careers.

It won multiple accolades, including MTV's Video Vanguard Award for Jackson's impact on entertainment. Entertainment Weekly considered the video "legendary", and Rolling Stone included it in a list of 10 Favorite Dancing Musicians, calling Jackson "a brilliant dancer" who it said "arguably had a greater long-term impact on the choreography of contemporary music videos" even more so than her own brother Michael Jackson had had. The publication also titled it "the gold standard for dystopian dance pop music videos", featuring "some of the most memorable choreography in pop video history". The Los Angeles Times considered Janet's choreography to be "even more enthralling" than those of her contemporaries. The long-form video won a Grammy Award for Best Long Form Music Video in 1990.

Music video
The black-and-white, military-inspired "Rhythm Nation" video was directed by Dominic Sena in August 1989. It was the finale in the Rhythm Nation 1814 film, following videos for "Miss You Much" and "The Knowledge", respectively. Known for its high-octane choreography in an abandoned factory, the video won an award for Best Choreography and was nominated for Best Dance Video at the MTV Video Music Awards, where Jackson also received the MTV Video Vanguard Award. "Rhythm Nation" ranked at thirty-seven on VH1's "Greatest 100 Videos" and forty-four on MTV's "100 Greatest Videos Ever Made". The video features a young Tyrin Turner. The success of "Rhythm Nation" allowed Sena to direct such subsequent films as Swordfish, Gone in 60 Seconds, and Season of the Witch.

Development
The "Rhythm Nation" video was filmed simultaneously with "Miss You Much" and "The Knowledge", which were later combined to form the long-form Rhythm Nation 1814 film. The video was filmed over a period of twenty days at the Pasadena Power Plant in Pasadena, California, and served as the finale in the series.

Speaking to MTV, Jackson said, "I knew who I wanted to direct 'Rhythm Nation,' that was simple: Dominic Sena. After working with him on 'Let's Wait Awhile,' I absolutely fell in love with him. [...] Dominic understood story, and he could put onscreen, from front to back, the whole picture you had in your head." Deciphering the video's scenery, Jackson explained, "the foggy, smoky street and the dark, black-and-white tone, that was all intentional. When you've done a lot of videos, it can be difficult to keep it fresh and new. You have to try something you've never done, in fear of looking like something you've already created." The video was shot in black-and-white to locate everybody's skin tone within shades of grey, portraying the Rhythm Nation'''s slogan: "We are like-minded individuals, sharing a common vision, pushing toward a world rif of color-lines." "There were so many races in that video, from Black to White and all the shades of gray in between. Black-and-white photography shows all those shades, and that's why we used it," said Jackson.<ref name=ebony>Ebony, February 1990. Page 50</ref>

"We're living in a very visual time right now," Jackson explains. "That's why videos are so important. Before, they really weren't. They play such an important part in the music business. The next is the live show. But the first they ever see of you is the video." Describing Jackson on the set of the video, journalist David Ritz said "Janet Jackson's mood seems retiring, but underneath, like so much else about her, there's more than meets the eye. For hours she obliges the camera during a grueling photography session on a sun-soaked day at the Pasadena Power Plant, a central locale for her black-and-white-dance video, a mysterious and metaphorical work dramatizing the concerns of Rhythm Nation." Jackson's clothes were considered to reflect "a quiet sadness", being "cooperative to a fault, yet inwardly shy".

Jackson was often questioned for her black attire and uniforms, saying "A lady came up to me and asked, 'Why do you always wear so much black? Is it because it is slimming?'" "Wearing black shows that for once that you can represent something positive and not negative," she emphasized, and offered harsh words for those who equate negativity with the color black, referring to the day the stock market crashed being known as "Black Monday". Jackson responds. Jackson recalled being hurt over the comments of an African-American critic who considered her black attire "drab", saying "He's been brainwashed because he can't see what I'm trying to show - and that hurt me so bad. I would hope that everyone will understand that for once black represents something good." "That's why I decided the color scheme for Rhythm Nation – the costumes, the cover art, the overall feeling - would be positively, uncompromisingly Black." Several label executives reportedly told Jackson the album and video wouldn't have "crossover" appeal. With Jackson's persistence, the video became "the most far-reaching single project the company has ever attempted". In a later interview, Jackson said "The concept basically was very industrial black and white, not wanting any color brought to it" – "no color lines is was it was, so everyone is all somewhat of the same kind of tone." "Dominic Sena directed it, it was a twenty day shoot. A lot of work, long hours." Sena commented "She's always out there trying to give people something different and fresh, and exciting to look at. If it's been done before she doesn't want anything to do with it, it's like 'let's start over'. Part of the reason she gravitated toward a new choreographer this time, a young guy who hadn't had that much experience, an amazing street dancer, and they developed a rapport and she said 'nobody's seen this guy's stuff before, I'll work with him. We'll develop these steps and give people something fresh to look at."

Choreography
The video's choreography has been considered one of the most recognizable and imitated routines in pop culture. Co-choreographer Anthony Thomas said, "she's not a trained dancer/ It comes from her soul. She's a natural. She's unbelievable." Rolling Stone included the video in a list of "10 Favorite Dancing Musicians", calling Jackson "a brilliant dancer" who has "arguably had a greater long-term impact on the choreography of contemporary music videos" than Michael Jackson, setting a format for "hundreds" of subsequent videos. The publication said "Jackson leads what appears to be a hip paramilitary organization through some of the most memorable choreography in pop video history." The publication also exclaimed Jackson's "dazzling dancing" and the "can-humans-really-do-that? choreography" in the video "is on a par with, and may even top, the best of brother Michael's hoof-happy videos", commending her "lightning speed".

Billboard commented "Ms. Jackson and her crew put on their military jackets and did the finely choreographed routine that fans everywhere wore out countless VHS tapes rewinding to memorize." Sweat, Tears, and Jazz Hands author Mike Weaver commended the video's impact on choreography, declaring "praised for its probing lyrics and video and production innovation, made her recognized and respected dancer and performer in the industry. Janet Jackson and her crew's innovative, one-of-a-kind, funk-and-groove choreography was unlike anything seen in the history of pop music. [...] By the early '90s, every show choir and every hiphop dancer wanted to cut and paste parts and pieces of the Rhythm Nation production into their set." The book Gender and Qualitative Methods suggested the routine represents "self-control and military discipline" – "they move in unison and in the same rhythm, dancing like roots, with stiff square arm movements," also exhibiting Asian martial arts. The Orlando Sentinel regarded Jackson to portray "Swiss-watch precision" in the routine. Slant Magazine said the clip "anointed Janet the ambassador of intricately choreographed", being among "the most intricately and powerfully choreographed music videos of all time". The Guardian said the routine was "made famous by its memorably routine-infested video", described as "an aerobic goose step" by The New York Times.  BET ranked the video as having the "Best Dance Moves in a Music Video" in 2013, commenting "the dance moves — from the finger count down to the standing split—were as crisp as the uniforms". Geico also noted The Running Man dance gained fame through the video.

Another critique stated "most of the video consists of Jackson with background dancers performing a synchronized dance routine. Judging by the serious facial expressions and vigorous body movements of Jackson and her dancers, the men and women in "Rhythm Nation" are confident, courageous, and display unmatched conviction." Jackson and her dancers were analyzed to "march toward the camera in a dominating manner" while simultaneously "performing moves that most humans couldn’t accomplish without a personal trainer and lots of free time on their hands." A brief scene potentially depicting sexuality in the video's choreography was also debated, though the video was ultimately praised for its depiction of social themes, explaining "Although there are no sexually explicit lyrics or messages in “Rhythm Nation” that would be obvious to audiences, there is a short scene two minutes and thirty eight seconds into the music video that is somewhat sexual. [...] Instead of using sexual elements to attract audiences, it portrays the strong bond between entertainers and social activists with a common goal."

Outfit
The outfit worn for the video and performances of the song is infamous in popular culture. Jackson's appearance includes "a fearless red-lipped pout and long black ponytail", along with "a black baseball hat with a metal "1814" applique, a black military-style shirt jacket with silver buckles and faux leather straps and collar, black belted pants and chunky, strappy boots." Another analysis observed Jackson and her dancers "dressed in black, cadet-style costumes that cover the entire body except the face". A biography of Jackson stated she attempted her performances to "center around her and her dancers, who would act as "soldiers" in a kind of army of reformers. Her outfit was a dark, buttonedup uniform, and she moved in tight formation with her dancers." The New York Times also said the clip "stars Ms. Jackson buttoned up tight in a tailored uniform, with an Army issue coat, epaulets and combat boots". An additional anecdote from the publication noted "Ms. Jackson, done up in black military-inspired garb, was eager to rail against societal ills like racism and domestic abuse."

Chris Ryan of MTV praised Jackson's look as trendsetting, saying "Janet took her place at the top of the trendsetting heap". MTV's Rebecca Thomas also commented Jackson "made a signature of dangling-key earrings, boxy black hats and suits adorned in gold hardware". Julianne Escobedo Shepherd of MTV Style spoke about its influence, recalling that "everyone wanted to dress like her" and dance classes would "dedicate hours" to the video's choreography; "she had her own personal Rhythm Nation hardware and bondage straps; I can't figure out or remember if she predated the Boy London hardware caps, but both were around the same time, and she was influential enough that it's not unlikely her steez gave them the idea." An additional critique regarded the video's wardrobe "intimidating" and "uniform fetish", likened to "some type of dark-ops cadet corps". Other aspects of Jackson's ensemble in the clip are also regarded as influential. Essence also praised Jackson as a trendsetter, commenting "she started her own movement with the hoop earrings with the solo key". Retail outlet Karmaloop called Jackson's snapback hat "80s signature style", selling a hat based on Jackson's. MTV credited the hat worn in the video as one of the reasons for the snapback hat's revival in popularity.

In 2011, Entertainment Weekly included the outfit at number nineteen on a list of 50 Stars Who Rocked Fashion, commenting Jackson adopted a "crisp military look for the ladies—with epaulets, cadet caps, fierce tailoring." In 2013, Lucky Magazine ranked the video among "The 18 Most Stylishly Influential Music Videos of All Time". The same year, Cosmopolitan listed "Rhythm Nation" among the "10 Most Iconic Music Video Looks of the 80s". In 2013, Alexander Fury of The Independent called Jackson a "style icon", exclaiming "the artwork created with Eighties illustrator Tony Viramontes for Control stands the test of time, as does the video for 1989's "Rhythm Nation", adding he was "obsessed" with the video's "get-up of quasi-military uniform accessorised with a single key on a hoop earring." Fury also said Jackson "deserves a place in the fashion hall of fame".

Themes
The themes of unity among the dancers and various ethnicities, as well as gender equality, has received praise from critics.

Slant Magazine observed "The solidarity of Janet Jackson's multi-racial Rhythm Nation dancers is evoked with hyper-synchronized movements while their individuality is expressed via their separate, distinct dances." The New York Times praised Jackson as a feminist, proclaiming "although most female characters on MTV are still reclining, swept off their feet by the fantasies of self-serving musicians and video directors, more singers are getting up and standing on their own two feet. You only have to catch Janet Jackson's hit, Rhythm Nation to be convinced that a change has taken place", calling it "a far cry from the lascivious bodies in various states of undress that flood the channel". 34th Street Magazine applauded the video's implication of gender neutrality, saying "“Rhythm Nation” makes a far superior statement on the fluidity of gender. In this video, men and women dress and dance identically and no one’s really sexualized. Everyone just knows how to move. In other words, sometimes the best way to send a positive message is not to try so damn hard." The clip's theme of activism and leadership was also commended, writing "instead of using sexual elements to attract audiences, it portrays the strong bond between entertainers and social activists with a common goal", in an attempt to speaks "particularly to young people and encourages them to be the leaders of tomorrow. Jackson passes on the message of social activist Mahatma Gandhi who once said, “You must be the change you wish to see in the world." A biography stated the video spreads "a message of love that was neither naive not superficial".

The video features dancers of "African-American, Caucasian, and Asian ancestry", aiding Jackson in becoming known for "breaking existing racial stereotypes specifically toward African-American women", depicting her as a "socially responsible citizen with dignity and grace". The backing dancers in the video were thought to represent "social activists", shrouded by "empty surroundings" deciphered as "the indifferent attitudes in society". Jackson and her dancers were considered "confident, courageous", and displaying "unmatched conviction". The video was used as an example of "positive gender performance of black women in a music video" in the book Gender and Qualitative Methods, considered to produce "a new kind of desire and a new position for a female viewer (and listener)". The video's director was noted to construct Jackson as "a creative, intelligent professional, someone who aims at promoting the status of black people, especially women".
Dressed in identical uniforms, Jackson and the dancers "move in unison and in the same rhythm, dancing like roots, with stiff square arm movements. ... Jackson is also dressed in a uniform and is performing asexually and almost anonymously in front of, but as one of the members of the group." The video was also one of the only popular music videos considered suitable to be broadcast to US troops in Middle Eastern countries such as Saudi Arabia and the Persian Gulf due to religious restrictions on the portrayal of female sexuality. Commenting on the situation, VH1 executive Jackie Sharp said "It's the perfect women's video, because they're all buttoned up to the neck and nobody touches".

Long-form music video
The full-length music video, known as the Rhythm Nation 1814 film, consists of the videos for "Miss You Much", "The Knowledge", and "Rhythm Nation", filmed simultaneously over a period of twenty days. The video premiered in full on September 16, 1989 on MTV to high ratings, and was aired several times the following week. Producer Jimmy Jam said "The concept for the half-hour, long-form video was already in the works when we recorded the album. Janet's choreographer was here, so we knew what the steps were going to be for the songs, how the story would be treated, and how the video was going to look. [...] We actually tried to make the album sound a little like the black-and-white images in the video, rather than adapting the video to the album. A lot of the music was treated almost as soundtrack."

While filming "The Knowledge", Jackson collapsed from exhaustion after filming for over 25 consecutive hours, explaining "That's the one area where I must be careful. Sometimes I won't sleep, won't stop reviewing, won't stop searching for ways to improve the projects. The projects absorb me. When we were filming the long video, I actually collapsed." Describing the situation, journalist David Ritz, who attended the video's filming, commented "Looking at "The Knowledge", it appears that Janet's physical breakdown came at the emotional climax of the video. "Prejudice, no!" she cries, kicking and smashing windows with the anger of a soul possessed. "Ignorance, no! Bigotry, no! Illiteracy, no!" she bemoans, before falling onto the ledge of the roof, dangerously positioned on the edge, ominous clouds of change racing overhead."

Legacy
The "Rhythm Nation" video received favorable reviews from critics and journalists, focusing on its theme of unity and choreography. Comparing Lady Gaga to Jackson, Kyle Anderson of MTV News described it as "the clip that sent Jackson into the stratosphere as an envelope-pushing pop star." It won a Grammy Award for Best Long Form Music Video in 1990.

Entertainment Weekly called the video "legendary", and Rolling Stone included it in a list of "10 Favorite Dancing Musicians", calling Jackson "a brilliant dancer" who has "arguably had a greater long-term impact on the choreography of contemporary music videos" than Michael Jackson. The publication added the video "set the template for hundreds of videos to come in the Nineties and aughts." It was also included in a list of the "Ten Best Apocalyptic Dance Music Videos" in 2011, heralded as "the gold standard for dystopian dance pop music videos" which features "some of the most memorable choreography in pop video history". The Sun Sentinel called it "dark, futuristic", and "unforgettable", adding "No one can witness the militaristic precision of Rhythm Nation, which gives the impression that a really angry pep squad has taken over the dance floor, and not see how Janet's style has been sampled, borrowed and stolen over and over ... and over."

In 2013, Cosmopolitan listed it among the "10 Most Iconic Music Video Looks of the 80s", saying "How do you step out from behind the shadow of the world’s biggest pop star? You strap on some black, wear a key as an earring and dance like you’re going to war. Janet is a style General and all the rest better fall in line." Slant Magazine ranked the video among the "100 Greatest Music Videos", calling the "stunning, monochromatic" video it "one of the most intricately and powerfully choreographed music videos of all time", saying "the solidarity of Janet Jackson's multi-racial Rhythm Nation dancers is evoked with hyper-synchronized movements while their individuality is expressed via their separate, distinct dances." The publication observed Jackson "saw dance as a movement in both senses of the word: an athletic extension of ones own socio-political force of will", as well as a "obliterator of races, genders, creeds", calling for a "Zen-like transcendence of self." The publication also stated, "if the song's music video inadvertently recalled the spirit of Leni Riefenstahl, its vision of unity through mandatory multiculturalism reverses the Nazi demagogue's ideology." Additional commentary said the clip "wasn’t the norm for most things in the 80s, let alone a pop music video." Another review considered it "groundbreaking" and "famous for its dynamic choreography in an abandoned factory", exclaiming "Fast-paced and bold, viewers become hooked to the catchy tunes and soulful sounds of the groundbreaking dance video."

Entertainment Weekly considered it "groundbreaking", also "striking, timeless and instantly recognizable". Elena Gooray of 34th Street Magazine praised the video's overall theme, concept, and wardrobe, exclaiming "Janet's messages? Justice, togetherness, the power of dance. Those ideas are simple and almost by definition inoffensive. Her use of military themes? Only to inspire her wardrobe and some incredibly synchronized dance routines with bangin' choreography."
Music journalist Richard Croft considered it "captivating, saying "Anyone with an interest in music videos, dancing, military jackets or nunchucks – you need to see the short film that accompanied 'Rhythm Nation'. It is incredible, one of the top five music videos ever made." Croft added, "I've never seen dancing like that in a video, and no matter how many times I see it, I can never look away. It's captivating. 'Rhythm Nation' is the most empowering, come-on-get-up song in the world. They should play it before sporting matches like the national anthem. Yet the lyrics never say that thinking positively and coming together is all we need to do to achieve our goals – there was work to do in 1989, there's work to do now. No struggle, no progress."

Rolling Stone described the full length piece as a "mini-musical" which "told the morality tale of two shoeshine boys who discover the Rhythm Nation". The New York Times stated the plot "juxtaposes her dance routines with grim urban imagery and a plot line about drugs versus dreams". Chris Willman of The LA Times considered it "ambitious" and "fun", saying "The can-humans-really-do-that? choreography in the three dance numbers is on a par with, and may even top, the best of brother Michael's hoof-happy videos". Willman added, "Miss You Much" is full of joy and giddy goofiness, and establishes shyly grinning Janet—a real team player in this big production number—as winsome and human after some of her earlier ice-goddess poses. "The Knowledge" and "Rhythm Nation" are angrier performances; the former is a bravura solo rooftop dance, with Jackson breaking windows and knocking over objects in rage at the dying of the light. What connects these numbers is an anti-drug story, unfortunately bolstered by the glitziness-among-the-L.A.-ruins imagery of "Blade Runner." Director Dominic Sena's "slick penchant for neato futuristic grime" was also praised, adding "the big-bass songs and the dazzling dancing say what the hokey script can't. Her feet, her body, her grace and her lightning speed are fine arguments for sobriety indeed."

In 2022, the music video was noted by computer security researchers for its ability to cause certain laptop hard drives manufactured in 2005 to malfunction. This was caused by tones in the video which matched the hard drive's natural resonant frequencies.

References

External links
 

Black-and-white music videos
Grammy Award for Best Long Form Music Video
Janet Jackson
Music videos directed by Dominic Sena
1980s music videos
1989 short films
1980s English-language films